Trailokya Rajya Lakshmi Devi (? – October 1850) was the Queen of Surendra Bikram Shah, King of Nepal. She was the mother of Trailokya, Crown Prince of Nepal.

References

Nepalese queens consort
1850 deaths
Year of birth missing
19th-century Nepalese people
People from Gulmi District
19th-century Nepalese nobility
Nepalese Hindus
Deaths in childbirth